Kotobuki (written: 寿 lit. "long life" or ことぶき in hiragana) a Japanese surname. Notable people with the surname include:

, Japanese musician
, Japanese actress, voice actress and singer
, Japanese character designer and manga artist

Fictional characters
, a character in the manga series Recently, My Sister Is Unusual
, a character in the anime series Project A-ko
, a character in the anime/manga series K-On!

See also
Kotobuki (folklore), a yōkai in Japanese mythology
, Japanese manga artist and actor
Kotobuki Station, a railway station in Yamanashi, Japan
Kotobuki System Co., Ltd., better known as Kemco
Nakajima Kotobuki, an aircraft engine
The Magnificent Kotobuki, an anime television series
Shouka (mountain pass), a mountain pass in southern Taiwan formerly known as Kotobuki Pass

Japanese-language surnames